Pamidovo Nunatak (‘Nunatak Pamidovo’ \'nu-na-tak pa-'mi-do-vo\) is the rocky ridge extending 4.42 km in west-southwest to east-northeast direction, 1.18 km wide, and rising to 1156 m in Voden Heights on Oscar II Coast in Graham Land.  It surmounts Fleece Glacier to the southwest.  Named after the settlement of Pamidovo in Southern Bulgaria.

Location
British mapping in 1976.

Maps
 British Antarctic Territory.  Scale 1:200000 topographic map.  DOS 610 Series, Sheet W 65 62.  Directorate of Overseas Surveys, Tolworth, UK, 1976.
 Antarctic Digital Database (ADD). Scale 1:250000 topographic map of Antarctica. Scientific Committee on Antarctic Research (SCAR). Since 1993, regularly upgraded and updated.

Notes

References
 Pamidovo Nunatak. SCAR Composite Antarctic Gazetteer.
 Bulgarian Antarctic Gazetteer. Antarctic Place-names Commission. (details in Bulgarian, basic data in English)

External links
 Pamidovo Nunatak. Copernix satellite image

Nunataks of Graham Land
Oscar II Coast
Bulgaria and the Antarctic